The Guinea-Bissau women's national football team is the representative women's association football team of Guinea-Bissau. Its governing body is the Football Federation of Guinea-Bissau (FFGB) and it competes as a member of the Confederation of African Football (CAF).

The national team's first activity was in 2006, when they played a friendly game against Guinea. Guinea-Bissau is currently ranked 169th in the FIFA Women's World Rankings.

Record per opponent
Key

The following table shows Guinea-Bissau' all-time official international record per opponent:

Results

2006

2017

2018

2019

2020

2021

2022

See also
 Guinea-Bissau national football team results

References

External links
 Guinea-Bissau results on The Roon Ba
 Guinea-Bissau results on Globalsports
 Guinea-Bissau results on worldfootball.net

2010s in Guinea-Bissau
2020s in Guinea-Bissau
Women's national association football team results